The Spiderweb Galaxy (PGC 2826829, MRC 1138-262) is an irregular galaxy with a redshift of 2.156, which is 10.6 billion light years away. It has been imaged by the Hubble Space Telescope on 12 October 2006. It is formed from dozens of smaller galaxies that were seen in the process of merging through mutual gravitational attraction.

References

External links
 ESA, Flies in a spider’s web: galaxy caught in the making, 12 October 2006
 SIMBAD, MRC_1138-262
 
 

Interacting galaxies
2826829
Hydra (constellation)